Michaela Morgan is a British children's author and poet. She has written more than 150 titles between 1987 and 2018 and publishes between two and three new titles each year. These range from picture books to junior novels. Her work is published internationally, and is also included on the Signed Stories web site where books are performed in sign language for hearing-impaired children.

Awards
Morgan was shortlisted in the Blue Peter Book Award 2013 and named an International Reading Association Children's Choice (2008). She won the United Kingdom Reading Association (now United Kingdom Literacy Association)'s 1995 Award.

In 2008, she was shortlisted in the Birmingham Libraries Award, 2008 for Respect (Barrington Stoke) about the black First World War hero, Walter Tull and the Surrey Libraries Award 2009 for Night Flight.

History
She started her career with the Edward series of picture books in the mid-1980s, having previously worked as a teacher and run her own shop. She works with a wide variety of publishers, though some of her longest running titles have been the Cool Clive books with Oxford University Press.

Her latest titles include Charming, Never shake a rattle snake, illustrated by the award-winning artist Nick Sharratt and Walter Tull's Scrapbook

References

External links

 
 

English children's writers
Living people
Date of birth missing (living people)
Place of birth missing (living people)
1951 births